Malokyzylbayevo (Kese Qıźılbay) is a rural locality (a village) in Alegazovsky Selsoviet, Mechetlinsky District, Bashkortostan, Russia. The population was 75 as of 2010. There is 1 street.

Geography 
Malokyzylbayevo is located 14 km west of Bolsheustyikinskoye (the district's administrative centre) by road. Alegazovo is the nearest rural locality.

References 

Rural localities in Mechetlinsky District